The Walter Cronkite Award for Excellence in Journalism is an annual award presented by Arizona State University's Walter Cronkite School of Journalism and Mass Communication. The recipient is deemed to represent a leading figure in the journalism industry, especially for ground-breaking achievements which have advanced the industry as a whole. The first award was presented by legendary journalist Walter Cronkite himself in 1984.

Recipients

Notes

References

External links 
 Walter Cronkite Award website

American journalism awards